Honkajoki (Hongonjoki until 1952) is a former municipality of Finland. It was merged with the town of Kankaanpää on 1 January 2021.

It was located in the province of Western Finland and was part of the Satakunta region.

The municipality was unilingually Finnish.

References

External links 

Municipality of Honkajoki – Official website

Municipalities of Satakunta
Populated places established in 1867
Populated places disestablished in 2021